Ricardo Javier Hurtado (born August 22, 1999) is an American actor. He is known for his role as Freddy on the 2016 Nickelodeon television series School of Rock and his voice over role as High Five on the 2020 Netflix TV series Glitch Techs.

Early life
Hurtado was born in Miami, Florida, to musician Ricardo Hurtado and Ofelia Ramirez, both from Nicaragua. When he was a year old, he moved to Atlanta with his parents.

Career 
Hurtado began acting in 2016, and first appeared on the Nickelodeon television series School of Rock as Freddy. He is starring as Tyler Gossard in Malibu Rescue. In November 2020, he announced his engagement to his girlfriend, ZuZu Holland.

Filmography

Film

Television

References

External links
 

1999 births
Living people
American male child actors
American male television actors
American people of Nicaraguan descent
Male actors from Atlanta
21st-century American male actors
Hispanic and Latino American male actors
American Christians